John Buller may refer to:

John Buller (Weymouth and Melcombe Regis MP), English Member of Parliament for Weymouth and Melcombe Regis (UK Parliament constituency), 1555
John Buller (politician, born 1632) (1632–1716), English Member of Parliament for East Looe, Grampound, Liskeard, Saltash and West Looe
John Buller (Lostwithiel MP) (1668–1701), English Member of Parliament for Lostwithiel, 1701
John Buller (politician, born 1721) (1721–1786), British Member of Parliament for East Looe
John Buller (politician, born 1745) (1745–1793), British Member of Parliament for Exeter, Launceston, and West Looe
John Buller (politician, died 1807), British Member of Parliament for East Looe, 1796–1799, 1802–1807
John Buller (politician, born 1771) (1771–1849), British Member of Parliament for West Looe, 1796, 1826
John Buller (composer) (1927–2004), British composer

See also
John Yarde-Buller, 1st Baron Churston
Buller (surname)